A relay is an electric switch operated by a signal in one circuit to control another circuit.

Relay may also refer to:

Historical
 Stage station, a place where exhausted horses being used for transport could be exchanged for fresh ones
 Cursus publicus, a courier service in the Roman Empire
 Relay league, a chain of message-forwarding stations

Computer networking
 BITNET Relay, a 1980s online chat system
 Mail relay, a server used for forwarding e-mail
 Open mail relay, such a server that can be used by anyone

Other telecommunication 
 Relay (satellite)
 Broadcast relay station, a transmitter which repeats or transponds the signal of another
 Microwave radio relay
 Relay channel, in information theory, a communications probability modeling system
 Telecommunications Relay Service, a telephone accessibility service for the deaf
 Repeater, an electronic device that receives and retransmits a signal

Automobiles
 Citroën Relay, a marketing name for the Fiat Ducato van
 Saturn Relay, a 2005-2007 minivan

Other uses
 Relay (shop), a France-based chain of convenience stores
 Relay (company), a peer-to-peer political texting platform
 "Relay" (song), 1972, by The Who
 Relay bid, in contract bridge
 Relay race, completed in parts by several participants of a team
 Relay neuron, in anatomy
 Relay box, a piece of postal infrastructure.

See also
 Retransmission (disambiguation)